The 2002 California Courts of Appeal election was held November 5, 2002.
The judges of the California Courts of Appeal are either approved to remain in their seat or rejected by the voters. All of the judges kept their seats.

Results
Final results from the California Secretary of State:

District 1

Division 1

Division 2

Division 3

Division 4

Division 5

District 2

Division 1

Division 2

Division 3

Division 4

Division 5

Division 6

Division 7

Division 8

District 3

District 4

Division 1

Division 2

Division 3

District 5

District 6

See also

Courts of Appeal elections, 2002
2002 Courts of Appeal